The  is an Independent Administrative Institution in Japan, established for the purpose of contributing to the advancement of science in all fields of the natural and social sciences and the humanities.

History
The Japan Society for the Promotion of Science was founded in 1932 as a non-profit foundation through an endowment granted by Emperor Shōwa. JSPS became a quasi-governmental organization in 1967 under the auspices of the Ministry of Education, Science, Sports and Culture (Monbusho), and after 2001 under the Ministry of Education, Culture, Sports, Science and Technology. In 2003, JSPS entered a new phase with its conversion to an Independent Administrative Institution. This new administrative configuration is intended to become a step towards improving the effectiveness and efficiency of JSPS's management, which in turn should help to improve the quality of the services which are offered to individual researchers, universities, and research institutes.

Timeline
The Japan Society for the Promotion of Science has expanded and evolved over time:
 1932 - JSPS is established as a non-profit foundation, endowed by Emperor Shōwa
 1933 - First University-Industry Cooperative Research Committee is organized
 1950 - First issue of Gakujutsu Geppo (Japanese Scientific Monthly) is published
 1959 - JSPS fellowship program for young Japanese scientists (Shorei Kenkyuin) is inaugurated
 1960 - JSPS program for inviting foreign researchers to Japan is commenced
 1963 - US-Japan Cooperative Science Program is established
 1965 - JSPS Research Station in Nairobi is opened
 1967 - JSPS is re-established as a quasi-governmental organization under the "Japan Society for the Promotion of Science Act"
 1976 - Cooperative programs with Southeast Asian countries are commenced
 1985 - JSPS fellowship program for young Japanese scientists (Tokubetsu Kenkyuin) is begun; the  JSPS International Prize for Biology is inaugurated
 1988 - JSPS program of granting postdoctoral fellowships to foreign researchers is inaugurated
 1990 - JSPS Liaison Office in Washington, D.C. is opened
 1992 - International Cooperative Program for Advanced Research is inaugurated
 1994 - Inter-Research Centers Cooperative Program is inaugurated
 1995 - JSPS Fellows Plaza is opened
 1996 - Research for the Future Program is inaugurated
 1998 - Japan-Australia Research Cooperative Program is inaugurated
 1999 - Award of Grants-in-Aid for Scientific Research is begun; Fureai Science Program is inaugurated
 2000 - JSPS Award for Eminent Scientists is inaugurated
 2001 - JSPS Liaison Office in Stockholm is opened
 2002 - 21st Century COE Program is inaugurated leading to the "Global COE (Centers of Excellence) Program"
 2003 - Research Center for Science system is established; JSPS is re-established as an independent administrative institution.

Programs
The Japan Society for the Promotion of Science plays a pivotal role in the administration of a wide spectrum of Japan's scientific and academic programs. It provides the highest amount of funding available to postdoctoral fellows in the world. Over this 70-year period, JSPS has initiated, implemented and administered an array of domestic and international scientific programs.  JSPS's operation is supported in large part by annual subsidies from the Japanese Government. Its main functions are:
 To foster young researchers,
 To promote international scientific cooperation,
 To award Grants-in-Aid for Scientific Research,
 To implement the Research for the Future Program,
 To support scientific cooperation between the academic community and industry, and
 To collect and distribute information on scientific research activities.

Publications
A number of publications are made available under the imprimatur of JSPS:
 Gakujutsu Geppo (Japanese Scientific Monthly), a monthly magazine containing scientific readings and articles on Japanese science policy and on scientific activities and research trends in governmental and academic organizations in Japan.
 Information re: Japanese universities, research institutions, and their various research activities.
 Scientific books.

See also
 List of Independent Administrative Institutions (Japan)
 List of National Laboratories (Japan)
 Mathematical Society of Japan
 Japan Society for Industrial and Applied Mathematics
 Japan Society of Applied Physics

References

External links
 JSPS, web page 
 JSPS,  web page 

Society for the Promotion of Science
Society for the Promotion of Science